Everton Galdino Moreira  (born 17 March 1997), known as Everton Galdino or just Everton, is a Brazilian professional footballer who plays as either an attacking midfielder or a forward for Grêmio, on loan from Tombense.

Club career
Born in Osasco, São Paulo, Everton was a Vila Nova youth graduate. He made his first team debut on 28 November 2014, coming on as a late substitute in a 3–2 Série B away win over Portuguesa, as both sides were already relegated.

On 10 May 2017, Everton was loaned to Tombense until the end of the Série C. He was bought by the club in November, and was regularly used afterwards.

On 18 August 2019, Everton was announced at Ponte Preta in the second division, on loan until the end of the year. He moved to Figueirense also in a temporary deal on 31 December, but had his loan terminated the following 9 November.

Upon returning to Tombense, Everton was an undisputed starter, contributing with eight goals in the 2021 Série C as his side achieved a first-ever promotion to the second division. In the 2022 Série B, he was also a first-choice, and scored seven goals.

On 7 December 2022, Everton agreed to a one-year loan deal with Grêmio, with a buyout clause.

Career statistics

Honours
Vila Nova
Campeonato Goiano Segunda Divisão: 2015

References

External links

1997 births
Living people
Sportspeople from Recife
Brazilian footballers
Association football midfielders
Association football forwards
Campeonato Brasileiro Série B players
Campeonato Brasileiro Série C players
Vila Nova Futebol Clube players
Tombense Futebol Clube players
Associação Atlética Ponte Preta players
Figueirense FC players
Grêmio Foot-Ball Porto Alegrense players